Events in the year 1952 in Brazil.

Incumbents

Federal government
 President: Getúlio Vargas 
 Vice President: Café Filho

Governors
 Alagoas: Arnon de Mello
 Amazonas: Álvaro Botelho Maia
 Bahia: Régis Pacheco
 Ceará: Raul Barbosa
 Espírito Santo: Jones dos Santos Neves (till 31 January); Francisco Alves Ataíde (from 31 January)
 Goiás: Pedro Ludovico Teixeira 
 Maranhão: 
 Mato Grosso: Fernando Corrêa da Costa
 Minas Gerais: Juscelino Kubitschek
 Pará: Zacarias de Assumpção
 Paraíba: José Américo de Almeida
 Paraná: Bento Munhoz da Rocha Neto
 Pernambuco: 
 until 24 August: Agamenon Magalhães
 24 August-12 December: Antônio Torres Galvão
 starting 12 December: Etelvino Lins de Albuquerque
 Piauí: Pedro Freitas
 Rio Grande do Norte: Silvio Piza Pedrosa
 Rio Grande do Sul: Ernesto Dornelles
 Santa Catarina: Irineu Bornhausen
 São Paulo: Lucas Nogueira Garcez
 Sergipe: Arnaldo Rollemberg Garcez

Vice governors
 Alagoas: Antônio Guedes de Miranda 
 Ceará: Stênio Gomes da Silva 
 Espírito Santo: Francisco Alves Ataíde
 Goiás: Jonas Ferreira Alves Duarte 
 Maranhão: Renato Bayma Archer da Silva
 Mato Grosso: João Leite de Barros 
 Minas Gerais: Clóvis Salgado da Gama 
 Paraíba: João Fernandes de Lima 
 Piauí: Tertuliano Milton Brandão 
 Rio de Janeiro: Tarcísio Miranda 
 Rio Grande do Norte: vacant 
 São Paulo: Erlindo Salzano 
 Sergipe: Edelzio Vieira de Melo

Events
4 March - Anchieta rail disaster: A crowded steam-powered passenger train derails while crossing a bridge over the Pavuna River near Anchieta station, sending two old wooden carriages broadside onto the adjacent line. A modern high-speed electric freight train travelling in the opposite direction ploughs into the wooden carriages, telescoping them upwards. The severity of the accident was compounded by the fact that the suburban train is overloaded, with passengers clinging to the sides, underneath and between the carriages. A witness says they saw "passengers flying in all directions when the crash occurred". 119 people are killed and the resulting outcry prompts major new investment in Brazilian railways.
All 50 people on board are killed in the worst-ever accident involving the Boeing 377.
19 July - Brazil at the 1952 Summer Olympics: A team of 97 competitors attends the Games in Helsinki, Finland.
12 August - 1952 Transportes Aéreos Nacional Douglas C-47 mid-air explosion: A Douglas C-47A registered PP-ANH is destroyed after a in-flight fire causes it to crash near Palmeiras de Goiás.  All 24 people on board are killed.
14 December -  The city of Paranavaí is founded.
‘’date unknown’’ – Bob's, Brazil’s first fast food chain, opens in Rio de Janeiro.

Arts and culture

Films
O Canto do Mar, directed by Alberto Cavalcanti.
Sai da frente, film debut of Amácio Mazzaropi.
Tico-Tico no Fubá, directed by Adolfo Celi, starring Anselmo Duarte and Tônia Carrero.

Music
João Gilberto - "Quando Ela Sai"

Television
Sítio do Pica-pau Amarelo, written by Tatiana Belinky and based on the series of novels of same name by Monteiro Lobato.

Births
18 January - Túlio Mourão, pianist and composer
22 February - Marcos Caruso, author, director, screenwriter and actor
17 August - Nelson Piquet, racing driver
19 August - Milton Hatoum, writer
10 September - Paulo Betti, actor
25 December - Luiz Carlos de Carvalho Teixeira de Freitas, journalist, psychologist and writer

Deaths
2 February - João Guilherme Fischer agronomic engineer (born 1876)

References

See also 
1952 in Brazilian football

 
1950s in Brazil
Years of the 20th century in Brazil
Brazil
1952 in South America